Pianosa Lighthouse is an active lighthouse located on the east side of Pianosa Island.

Description
The lighthouse entered service on 1 October 1865, is currently operated by the Marina Militare.

See also
 List of lighthouses in Italy
 Pianosa
 Tuscan Archipelago

References

External links
 Servizio Fari Marina Militare

Lighthouses in Campo nell'Elba
Pianosa
Lighthouses in Tuscany
Lighthouses in Italy